Éva Ruttkai (31 December 1927 – 27 September 1986) was a Hungarian actress, well known from her work on stage, cinema, and television productions. She was the wife of Miklós Gábor, and later Zoltán Latinovits.

Life
Éva Ruttkai (born Éva Russ) was born on 31 December 1927, in Budapest, as the sixth child (though only she, and her brothers Iván and Ottó reached adulthood). The family had hard time to make a living. The two brothers already worked as child actors, with Ruttkai following them from age 2. With her brother Iván she worked in the Vígszínház theatre, then in the children theatre of Artúr Lakner, where Ruttkai could work together with well-known actors like Lili Darvas or Artúr Somlay. Gaining the attention of Dániel Jób, director of the Vígszínház, she was contracted at age 16, playing there until her death (except for 1948–51, playing in the National Theatre). She married Miklós Gábor in 1950, giving birth to a daughter, Júlia, two years later. Meeting Zoltán Latinovits in 1960 during rehearsals, they lived together until Latinovits's death.

Death
In 1984, Ruttkai was diagnosed with breast cancer. Half a year after her last stage appearance, she died on 27 September 1986.

Legacy
During her four decade of career, Éva Ruttkai became one of the most versatile actress of her time, gaining critical acclaim in both classical and modern, native and foreign stage roles, and a wide range of movies and television films. She won the Kossuth Prize in 1960.

Selected filmography

Film

1934: Lila akác
1948: Beszterce ostroma - Ancsura
1949: Szabóné
1950: Mattie the Goose-boy - Gyöngyi - Döbrögi lánya
1950: Kis Katalin házassága - Vilcsi
1951: Különös házasság - Katica
1951: A selejt bosszúja (Short) - Manci
1951: Költözik a hivatal (Short) - Bözsi
1954: Én és a nagyapám - Margit néni
1954: Liliomfi - Erzsi
1955: Budapesti tavasz
1955: Különös ismertetőjel - Eszti
1955: A Glass of Beer - Cséri Juli
1956: Ünnepi vacsora - Klári
1956: Nem igaz (Short) - Királylány
1957: Mese a 12 találatról - Kató,tornatanárnõ
1957: A császár parancsára - Lotte
1957: Éjfélkor - Dékány Viktória
1958: Sóbálvány - Elzi
1958: Micsoda éjszaka - Vera
1958: Egyiptomi útijegyzetek - Narrátor
1959: Álmatlan évek - Vilma
1959: Kard és kocka - Jozefa
1960: Három csillag - Mari
1960: Alázatosan jelentem - Anna
1960: Az arcnélküli város - Vali, Galetta felesége
1961: Amíg holnap lesz - Szabó Viola
1962: Az utolsó vacsora - Jesszi
1962: Pirosbetűs hétköznapok - Klement Klára
1963: Asszony a telepen - Éva, özvegy Szekeresné
1963: Foto Háber - Barabás Anna
1966: Story of My Foolishness - Kabók Kati
1966: Minden kezdet nehéz
1966: Kárpáthy Zoltán - Flóra, Szentirmay felesége
1966: Egy magyar nábob - Szentirmayné, Flóra
1967: A múmia közbeszól - Françoise Chantal / Hidegarcú Hölgy
1967: Kártyavár - Zizi
1967: Keresztelő - Dóra
1968: A hamis Izabella - Dr.Végh Márta
1968: Tanulmány a nőkről - Éva, Balogh felesége
1968: Stars of Eger - Izabella Királynõ
1969: Alfa Rómeó és Júlia - Dr. Szabó Júlia
1970: Utazás a koponyám körül - Karinthy felesége
1970: N.N. a halál angyala - Judit, Korin felesége (uncredited)
1970: Történelmi magánügyek - Terényi Mária
1970: Csak egy telefon - Ágostonné,Éva
1970: Szerelmi álmok – Liszt - Carolyne (voice, uncredited)
1971: Szindbád - Lenke
1972: Volt egyszer egy család - Liza
1975: Ha megjön József - Ágnes, József anyja
1976: Labirintus - Mara, színésznõ / Anna
1986: Idő van - Halasi's mother
1986: Keserű igazság - Klári
1988: Küldetés Evianba - Selma Selig (final film role)

Television films
1958: Papucs - Júlia
1961: A szerző ma meghal - Diana
1962: Két üres pohár - Éva
1962: A vak
1963: Kreutzer szonáta - Feleség
1964: Lajos király válik - Királyné
1966: Látszat és valóság
1966: Távolsági történet
1969: Bözsi és a többiek 1–3 (TV Mini-Series) - Bözsi
1968: Az aranykesztyű lovagjai (TV Mini-Series) - Mrs. Harrison
1968: A férfi - Judit
1969: A régi nyár - Mária Koháry, actress
1969: Olykor a hegedűk is
1969: Én, Prenn Ferenc
1969: Komédia a tetőn
1970: Lujzi
1970: Tévedni isteni dolog
1972: A képzelt beteg - Toinette
1978: Abigél (TV Mini-Series) - Horn Mici
1985: Egy fiú bőrönddel - Dobosyné, Péter anyja
1985: Fantasztikus nagynéni - Amália néni

Sources
Gábor, Szigethy. Ruttkai. Budapest: Budapest Terra, 1987. 
Gábor, Szigethy. Parancsolj, tündérkirálynőm!. Budapest: Zeneműkiadó, 1989. 
Attila, Deák. Ruttkai Éva: Kortársaink a filmművészetben. Budapest: Múzsák Közművelődési Kiadó, 1986. 
 Éva Ruttkai in the Hungarian Theatrical Lexicon (György, Székely. Magyar Színházművészeti Lexikon. Budapest: Akadémiai Kiadó, 1994. ), freely available on mek.oszk.hu

External links

 A fansite dedicated for Éva Ruttkai
 Éva Ruttkai on filmkatalogus.hu
 

1927 births
1986 deaths
Hungarian stage actresses
Hungarian film actresses
Hungarian television actresses
20th-century Hungarian actresses
Burials at Farkasréti Cemetery
Deaths from cancer in Hungary
Deaths from breast cancer
Actresses from Budapest